Dinosaur is the debut studio album by the alternative rock band Dinosaur Jr. It was released in 1985 on Homestead Records. The album exhibits a folkier side of the band than on future releases, but some of the tracks on the album showed off a much heavier, more hardcore punk-based side to the band in songs such as "Does it Float", "Mountain Man" and "Bulbs of Passion."

The album was originally released when the band was still known simply as Dinosaur, before a lawsuit forced the name change to Dinosaur Jr. Therefore, it was originally a self-titled album, but subsequent issues kept the Dinosaur title.

Reception
Critical reception of the album was mixed to positive. In a retrospective review for AllMusic, Stephen Thomas Erlewine gave the albums 3 stars out of a possible 5, describing Dinosaur as having a few standout songs but overall as "impressive, but uneven" due to the band's struggling to integrate hardcore punk, hard rock with touches of experimental music. Pitchfork Media ranked the album at 6.2 out of 10, describing it as "a fucking mess" with overlong songs drawing on too many styles to be consistent.

Track listing

All songs written by J Mascis.

"Bulbs of Passion" was not featured on the original vinyl LP; it was a b-side to the "Repulsion" single.  Subsequent reissues on cassette and compact disc featured it as the last song.  The 2005 reissue on Merge Records placed "Bulbs of Passion" as the first track at J Mascis' request.  "Yeah, I asked for that," J recalls, "because [that song] gave our new direction - it felt like we were our own sound."  Also featured was a 1987 live performance of "Does It Float" as a bonus track to close out the album.

Personnel
Dinosaur Jr.
 J Mascis - vocals, guitar, percussion
 Lou Barlow - bass, vocals, synthesizer
 Murph - drums, vocals, synthesizer

Additional Personnel
 Chris Dixon and Glen - engineering
 Jason Talerman - photography
 Maura Jasper - cover art
 Lou Barlow - back cover art

References

Dinosaur Jr. albums
1985 debut albums
Homestead Records albums